The 68th United States Congress was a meeting of the legislative branch of the United States federal government, consisting of the United States Senate and the United States House of Representatives. It met in Washington, D.C., from March 4, 1923, to March 4, 1925, during the last months of Warren G. Harding's presidency, and the first years of the administration of his successor, Calvin Coolidge. The apportionment of seats in the House of Representatives was based on the 1910 United States census.

Both chambers maintained a Republican majority—albeit greatly reduced from the previous Congress and with losing supermajority status in the House—and along with President Harding, the Republicans maintained an overall federal government trifecta.

Major events

 August 2, 1923: President Warren G. Harding dies, and Vice President Calvin Coolidge becomes President of the United States
 December 3–5, 1923: The election for the House speakership takes 9 ballots

Major legislation

 April 26, 1924: Seed and Feed Loan Act
 May 19, 1924: World War Adjusted Compensation Act (Bonus Bill), Sess. 1, ch. 157, 
 May 24, 1924: Rogers Act
 May 26, 1924: Immigration Act of 1924 (Johnson–Reed Act), Sess. 1, ch. 190, 
 May 29, 1924: Indian Oil Leasing Act of 1924 (Lenroot Act)
 June 2, 1924: Indian Citizenship Act of 1924 (Snyder Act), Sess. 1, ch. 233, 
 June 2, 1924: Revenue Act of 1924 (Simmons–Longworth Act), Sess. 1, ch. 234, 
 June 3, 1924: Inland Waterways Act of 1924 (Denison Act)
 June 7, 1924: Pueblo Lands Act of 1924
 June 7, 1924: Oil Pollution Act of 1924, ch. 316, 
 June 7, 1924: Clarke–McNary Act, Sess. 1, ch. 348, 
 January 30, 1925: Hoch–Smith Resolution
 January 31, 1925: Special Duties Act
 February 2, 1925: Air Mail Act of 1925 (Kelly Act)
 February 12, 1925: Federal Arbitration Act
 February 16, 1925: Home Port Act of 1925
 February 24, 1925: Purnell Act
 February 27, 1925: Temple Act
 February 28, 1925: Classification Act of 1925
 February 28, 1925: Federal Corrupt Practices Act (Gerry Act)
 March 2, 1925: Judiciary Act of 1925
 March 3, 1925: River and Harbors Act of 1925
 March 3, 1925: Helium Act of 1925
 March 4, 1925: Establishment of the United States Navy Band
 March 4, 1925: Probation Act of 1925

Constitutional amendments
 June 2, 1924: Approved an amendment to the United States Constitution that would specifically authorize Congress to regulate "labor of persons under eighteen years of age", and submitted it to the state legislatures for ratification
 This amendment, commonly known as the Child Labor Amendment, has not been ratified and is still pending before the states.

Party summary
The count below identifies party affiliations at the beginning of the first session of this Congress, and includes members from vacancies and newly admitted states, when they were first seated. Changes resulting from subsequent replacements are shown below.

Senate

House of Representatives

Leadership

Senate 
President: Calvin Coolidge (R), until August 3, 1923; vacant thereafter.
President pro tempore: Albert B. Cummins (R)

Majority (Republican) leadership 
 Majority leader: Charles Curtis
 Majority whip: Wesley L. Jones
 Republican Conference Secretary: James Wolcott Wadsworth Jr.
 National Senatorial Committee Chair: George H. Moses

Minority (Democratic) leadership 
 Minority leader: Joseph T. Robinson
 Minority whip: Peter G. Gerry
 Democratic Caucus Secretary: William H. King

House of Representatives 
 Speaker: Frederick H. Gillett (R) elected December 5, 1923, after 9 rounds of balloting

Majority (Republican) leadership 
 Majority leader: Nicholas Longworth
 Majority Whip: Albert H. Vestal
 Republican Conference Chairman: Sydney Anderson
 Republican Campaign Committee Chairman: William R. Wood

Minority (Democratic) leadership 
Minority Leader: Finis J. Garrett
Minority Whip: William Allan Oldfield
 Democratic Caucus Chairman: Henry Thomas Rainey
 Democratic Campaign Committee Chairman: Arthur B. Rouse

Members
This list is arranged by chamber, then by state. Senators are listed by class, and representatives are listed by district.

Skip to House of Representatives, below

Senate
Senators were elected every two years, with one-third beginning new six-year terms with each Congress. Preceding the names in the list below are Senate class numbers, which indicate the cycle of their election. In this Congress, Class 1 meant their term began in this Congress, requiring re-election in 1928; Class 2 meant their term ended with this Congress, requiring re-election in 1924; and Class 3 meant their term began in the last Congress, requiring re-election in 1926.

Alabama 
 2. J. Thomas Heflin (D)
 3. Oscar W. Underwood (D)

Arizona 
 1. Henry F. Ashurst (D)
 3. Ralph H. Cameron (R)

Arkansas 
 2. Joseph T. Robinson (D)
 3. Thaddeus H. Caraway (D)

California 
 1. Hiram W. Johnson (R)
 3. Samuel M. Shortridge (R)

Colorado 
 2. Lawrence C. Phipps (R)
 3. Samuel D. Nicholson (R), until March 24, 1923 
 Alva B. Adams (D), from May 17, 1923, until November 30, 1924
 Rice W. Means (R), from December 1, 1924

Connecticut 
 1. George P. McLean (R)
 3. Frank B. Brandegee (R), until October 14, 1924
 Hiram Bingham III (R), from December 17, 1924

Delaware 
 1. Thomas F. Bayard Jr. (D)
 2. L. Heisler Ball (R)

Florida 
 1. Park Trammell (D)
 3. Duncan U. Fletcher (D)

Georgia 
 2. William J. Harris (D)
 3. Walter F. George (D)

Idaho 
 2. William E. Borah (R)
 3. Frank R. Gooding (R)

Illinois 
 2. J. Medill McCormick (R), until February 25, 1925
 Charles S. Deneen (R), from February 26, 1925
 3. William B. McKinley (R)

Indiana 
 1. Samuel M. Ralston (D)
 3. James E. Watson (R)

Iowa 
 2. Smith W. Brookhart (R)
 3. Albert B. Cummins (R)

Kansas 
 2. Arthur Capper (R)
 3. Charles Curtis (R)

Kentucky 
 2. Augustus O. Stanley (D)
 3. Richard P. Ernst (R)

Louisiana 
 2. Joseph E. Ransdell (D)
 3. Edwin S. Broussard (D)

Maine 
 1. Frederick Hale (R)
 2. Bert M. Fernald (R)

Maryland 
 1. William Cabell Bruce (D)
 3. Ovington E. Weller (R)

Massachusetts 
 1. Henry Cabot Lodge (R), until November 9, 1924
 William M. Butler (R), from November 13, 1924
 2. David I. Walsh (D)

Michigan 
 1. Woodbridge N. Ferris (D)
 2. James J. Couzens (R)

Minnesota 
 1. Henrik Shipstead (FL)
 2. Knute Nelson (R), until April 28, 1923
 Magnus Johnson (FL), from July 16, 1923

Mississippi 
 1. Hubert D. Stephens (D)
 2. B. Patton Harrison (D)

Missouri 
 1. James A. Reed (D)
 3. Selden P. Spencer (R)

Montana 
 1. Burton K. Wheeler (D)
 2. Thomas J. Walsh (D)

Nebraska 
 1. Robert B. Howell (R)
 2. George W. Norris (R)

Nevada 
 1. Key Pittman (D)
 3. Tasker L. Oddie (R)

New Hampshire 
 2. Henry W. Keyes (R)
 3. George H. Moses (R)

New Jersey 
 1. Edward I. Edwards (D)
 2. Walter E. Edge (R)

New Mexico 
 1. Andrieus A. Jones (D)
 2. Holm O. Bursum (R)

New York 
 1. Royal S. Copeland (D)
 3. James W. Wadsworth Jr. (R)

North Carolina 
 3. Lee S. Overman (D)
 2. Furnifold McL. Simmons (D)

North Dakota 
 1. Lynn Frazier (R-NPL)
 3. Edwin F. Ladd (R)

Ohio 
 1. Simeon D. Fess (R)
 3. Frank B. Willis (R)

Oklahoma 
 2. Robert L. Owen (D)
 3. John W. Harreld (R)

Oregon 
 2. Charles L. McNary (R)
 3. Robert N. Stanfield (R)

Pennsylvania 
 1. David A. Reed (R)
 3. George Wharton Pepper (R)

Rhode Island 
 1. Peter G. Gerry (D)
 2. LeBaron B. Colt (R), until August 18, 1924
 Jesse H. Metcalf (R), from November 5, 1924

South Carolina 
 2. Nathaniel B. Dial (D)
 3. Ellison D. Smith (D)

South Dakota 
 2. Thomas Sterling (R)
 3. Peter Norbeck (R)

Tennessee 
 1. Kenneth D. McKellar (D)
 2. John K. Shields (D)

Texas 
 1. Earle B. Mayfield (D)
 2. Morris Sheppard (D)

Utah 
 1. William H. King (D)
 3. Reed Smoot (R)

Vermont 
 1. Frank L. Greene (R)
 3. William P. Dillingham (R), until July 12, 1923
 Porter H. Dale (R), from November 7, 1923

Virginia 
 1. Claude A. Swanson (D)
 2. Carter Glass (D)

Washington 
 1. Clarence C. Dill (D)
 3. Wesley L. Jones (R)

West Virginia 
 1. Matthew M. Neely (D)
 2. Davis Elkins (R)

Wisconsin 
 1. Robert M. La Follette Sr. (R)
 3. Irvine L. Lenroot (R)

Wyoming 
 1. John B. Kendrick (D)
 2. Francis E. Warren (R)

House of Representatives
The names of members of the House of Representatives elected statewide on the general ticket or otherwise at-large, are preceded by their district numbers.

Alabama 
 . John McDuffie (D)
 . John R. Tyson (D), until March 27, 1923
 J. Lister Hill (D), from August 14, 1923
 . Henry B. Steagall (D)
 . Lamar Jeffers (D)
 . William B. Bowling (D)
 . William B. Oliver (D)
 . Miles C. Allgood (D)
 . Edward B. Almon (D)
 . George Huddleston (D)
 . William B. Bankhead (D)

Arizona 
 . Carl T. Hayden (D)

Arkansas 
 . William J. Driver (D)
 . William A. Oldfield (D)
 . John N. Tillman (D)
 . Otis T. Wingo (D)
 . Heartsill Ragon (D)
 . Lewis E. Sawyer (D), until May 5, 1923
 James B. Reed (D), from October 6, 1923
 . Tilman B. Parks (D)

California 
 . Clarence F. Lea (D)
 . John E. Raker (D)
 . Charles F. Curry (R)
 . Julius Kahn (R), until December 18, 1924
 . Mae E. Nolan (R)
 . James H. MacLafferty (R)
 . Henry E. Barbour (R)
 . Arthur M. Free (R)
 . Walter F. Lineberger (R)
 . John D. Fredericks (R), from May 1, 1923
 . Philip D. Swing (R)

Colorado 
 . William N. Vaile (R)
 . Charles B. Timberlake (R)
 . Guy U. Hardy (R)
 . Edward T. Taylor (D)

Connecticut 
 . E. Hart Fenn (R)
 . Richard P. Freeman (R)
 . John Q. Tilson (R)
 . Schuyler Merritt (R)
 . Patrick B. O'Sullivan (D)

Delaware 
 . William H. Boyce (D)

Florida 
 . Herbert J. Drane (D)
 . Frank Clark (D)
 . John H. Smithwick (D)
 . William J. Sears (D)

Georgia 
 . R. Lee Moore (D)
 . Frank Park (D)
 . Charles R. Crisp (D)
 . William C. Wright (D)
 . William D. Upshaw (D)
 . James W. Wise (D)
 . Gordon Lee (D)
 . Charles H. Brand (D)
 . Thomas M. Bell (D)
 . Carl Vinson (D)
 . William C. Lankford (D)
 . William W. Larsen (D)

Idaho 
 . Burton L. French (R)
 . Addison T. Smith (R)

Illinois 
 . Henry R. Rathbone (R)
 . Richard Yates Jr. (R)
 . Martin B. Madden (R)
 . Morton D. Hull (R), from April 3, 1923
 . Elliott W. Sproul (R)
 . John W. Rainey (D), until May 4, 1923
 Thomas A. Doyle (D), from November 6, 1923
 . Adolph J. Sabath (D)
 . James R. Buckley (D)
 . M. Alfred Michaelson (R)
 . Stanley H. Kunz (D)
 . Frederick A. Britten (R)
 . Carl R. Chindblom (R)
 . Frank R. Reid (R)
 . Charles E. Fuller (R)
 . John C. McKenzie (R)
 . William J. Graham (R), until June 7, 1924
 . Edward J. King (R)
 . William E. Hull (R)
 . Frank H. Funk (R)
 . William P. Holaday (R)
 . Allen F. Moore (R)
 . Henry T. Rainey (D)
 . J. Earl Major (D)
 . Edward E. Miller (R)
 . William W. Arnold (D)
 . Thomas S. Williams (R)
 . Edward E. Denison (R)

Indiana 
 . William E. Wilson (D)
 . Arthur H. Greenwood (D)
 . Frank Gardner (D)
 . Harry C. Canfield (D)
 . Everett Sanders (R)
 . Richard N. Elliott (R)
 . Merrill Moores (R)
 . Albert H. Vestal (R)
 . Fred S. Purnell (R)
 . William R. Wood (R)
 . Samuel E. Cook (D)
 . Louis W. Fairfield (R)
 . Andrew J. Hickey (R)

Iowa 
 . William F. Kopp (R)
 . Harry E. Hull (R)
 . Thomas J. B. Robinson (R)
 . Gilbert N. Haugen (R)
 . Cyrenus Cole (R)
 . C. William Ramseyer (R)
 . Cassius C. Dowell (R)
 . Horace M. Towner (R), until April 1, 1923
 Hiram K. Evans (R), from June 4, 1923
 . William R. Green (R)
 . Lester J. Dickinson (R)
 . William D. Boies (R)

Kansas 
 . Daniel R. Anthony Jr. (R)
 . Edward C. Little (R), until June 27, 1924
 Ulysses S. Guyer (R), from November 4, 1924
 . William H. Sproul (R)
 . Homer Hoch (R)
 . James G. Strong (R)
 . Hays B. White (R)
 . Jasper N. Tincher (R)
 . William A. Ayres (D)

Kentucky 
 . Alben W. Barkley (D)
 . David H. Kincheloe (D)
 . Robert Y. Thomas Jr. (D)
 . Ben Johnson (D)
 . Maurice H. Thatcher (R)
 . Arthur B. Rouse (D)
 . James C. Cantrill (D), until September 2, 1923
 Joseph W. Morris (D), from November 30, 1923
 . Ralph W. E. Gilbert (D)
 . William J. Fields (D), until December 11, 1923
 Frederick M. Vinson (D), from January 24, 1924
 . John W. Langley (R)
 . John M. Robsion (R)

Louisiana 
 . James O'Connor (D)
 . H. Garland Dupré (D), until February 21, 1924
 J. Zach Spearing (D), from April 22, 1924
 . Whitmell P. Martin (D)
 . John N. Sandlin (D)
 . Riley J. Wilson (D)
 . George K. Favrot (D)
 . Ladislas Lazaro (D)
 . James B. Aswell (D)

Maine 
 . Carroll L. Beedy (R)
 . Wallace H. White Jr. (R)
 . John E. Nelson (R)
 . Ira G. Hersey (R)

Maryland 
 . T. Alan Goldsborough (D)
 . Millard E. Tydings (D)
 . John Philip Hill (R)
 . J. Charles Linthicum (D)
 . Sydney E. Mudd II (R), until October 11, 1924
 Stephen W. Gambrill (D), from November 4, 1924
 . Frederick N. Zihlman (R)

Massachusetts 
 . Allen T. Treadway (R)
 . Frederick H. Gillett (R)
 . Calvin D. Paige (R)
 . Samuel E. Winslow (R)
 . John Jacob Rogers (R)
 . Abram Andrew (R)
 . William P. Connery Jr. (D)
 . Frederick W. Dallinger (R)
 . Charles L. Underhill (R)
 . Peter F. Tague (D)
 . George Holden Tinkham (R)
 . James A. Gallivan (D)
 . Robert Luce (R)
 . Louis A. Frothingham (R)
 . William S. Greene (R), until September 22, 1924
 Robert M. Leach (R), from November 4, 1924
 . Charles L. Gifford (R)

Michigan 
 . Robert H. Clancy (D)
 . Earl C. Michener (R)
 . John M. C. Smith (R), until March 30, 1923
 Arthur B. Williams (R), from June 19, 1923
 . John C. Ketcham (R)
 . Carl E. Mapes (R)
 . Grant M. Hudson (R)
 . Louis C. Cramton (R)
 . Bird J. Vincent (R)
 . James C. McLaughlin (R)
 . Roy O. Woodruff (R)
 . Frank D. Scott (R)
 . W. Frank James (R)
 . Clarence J. McLeod (R)

Minnesota 
 . Sydney Anderson (R)
 . Frank Clague (R)
 . Charles R. Davis (R)
 . Oscar E. Keller (R)
 . Walter H. Newton (R)
 . Harold Knutson (R)
 . Ole J. Kvale (FL)
 . Oscar J. Larson (R)
 . Knud Wefald (FL)
 . Thomas D. Schall (R)

Mississippi 
 . John E. Rankin (D)
 . Bill G. Lowrey (D)
 . Benjamin G. Humphreys II (D), until October 16, 1923
 William Y. Humphreys (D), from November 27, 1923
 . T. Jefferson Busby (D)
 . Ross A. Collins (D)
 . T. Webber Wilson (D)
 . Percy E. Quin (D)
 . James W. Collier (D)

Missouri 
 . Milton A. Romjue (D)
 . Ralph F. Lozier (D)
 . Jacob L. Milligan (D)
 . Charles L. Faust (R)
 . Henry L. Jost (D)
 . Clement C. Dickinson (D)
 . Samuel C. Major (D)
 . Sidney C. Roach (R)
 . Clarence A. Cannon (D)
 . Cleveland A. Newton (R)
 . Harry B. Hawes (D)
 . Leonidas C. Dyer (R)
 . J. Scott Wolff (D)
 . James F. Fulbright (D)
 . Joe J. Manlove (R)
 . Thomas L. Rubey (D)

Montana 
 . John M. Evans (D)
 . Scott Leavitt (R)

Nebraska 
 . John H. Morehead (D)
 . Willis G. Sears (R)
 . Edgar Howard (D)
 . Melvin O. McLaughlin (R)
 . Ashton C. Shallenberger (D)
 . Robert G. Simmons (R)

Nevada 
 . Charles L. Richards (D)

New Hampshire 
 . William N. Rogers (D)
 . Edward H. Wason (R)

New Jersey 
 . Francis F. Patterson Jr. (R)
 . Isaac Bacharach (R)
 . Elmer H. Geran (D)
 . Charles Browne (D)
 . Ernest R. Ackerman (R)
 . Randolph Perkins (R)
 . George N. Seger (R)
 . Frank J. McNulty (D)
 . Daniel F. Minahan (D)
 . Frederick R. Lehlbach (R)
 . John J. Eagan (D)
 . Charles F.X. O'Brien (D)

New Mexico 
 . John Morrow (D)

New York 
 . Robert L. Bacon (R)
 . John J. Kindred (D)
 . George W. Lindsay (D)
 . Thomas H. Cullen (D)
 . Loring M. Black Jr. (D)
 . Charles I. Stengle (D)
 . John F. Quayle (D)
 . William E. Cleary (D)
 . David J. O'Connell (D)
 . Emanuel Celler (D)
 . Daniel J. Riordan (D), until April 28, 1923
 Anning S. Prall (D), from November 6, 1923
 . Samuel Dickstein (D)
 . Christopher D. Sullivan (D)
 . Nathan D. Perlman (R)
 . John J. Boylan (D)
 . John J. O'Connor (D), from November 6, 1923
 . Ogden L. Mills (R)
 . John F. Carew (D)
 . Sol Bloom (D)
 . Fiorello H. LaGuardia (R)
 . Royal H. Weller (D)
 . Anthony J. Griffin (D)
 . Frank Oliver (D)
 . James V. Ganly (D), until September 7, 1923
 Benjamin L. Fairchild (R), from November 6, 1923
 . J. Mayhew Wainwright (R)
 . Hamilton Fish III (R)
 . Charles B. Ward (R)
 . Parker Corning (D)
 . James S. Parker (R)
 . Frank Crowther (R)
 . Bertrand H. Snell (R)
 . Luther W. Mott (R), until July 10, 1923
 Thaddeus C. Sweet (R), from November 6, 1923
 . Homer P. Snyder (R)
 . John D. Clarke (R)
 . Walter W. Magee (R)
 . John Taber (R)
 . Gale H. Stalker (R)
 . Meyer Jacobstein (D)
 . Archie D. Sanders (R)
 . S. Wallace Dempsey (R)
 . Clarence MacGregor (R)
 . James M. Mead (D)
 . Daniel A. Reed (R)

North Carolina 
 . Hallett S. Ward (D)
 . Claude Kitchin (D), until May 31, 1923
 John H. Kerr (D), from November 6, 1923
 . Charles L. Abernethy (D)
 . Edward W. Pou (D)
 . Charles M. Stedman (D)
 . Homer L. Lyon (D)
 . William C. Hammer (D)
 . Robert L. Doughton (D)
 . Alfred L. Bulwinkle (D)
 . Zebulon Weaver (D)

North Dakota 
 . Olger B. Burtness (R)
 . George M. Young (R), until September 2, 1924
 Thomas Hall (R), from November 4, 1924
 . James H. Sinclair (R)

Ohio 
 . Nicholas Longworth (R)
 . Ambrose E.B. Stephens (R)
 . Roy G. Fitzgerald (R)
 . John L. Cable (R)
 . Charles J. Thompson (R)
 . Charles C. Kearns (R)
 . Charles Brand (R)
 . R. Clinton Cole (R)
 . Isaac R. Sherwood (D)
 . Israel M. Foster (R)
 . Mell G. Underwood (D)
 . John C. Speaks (R)
 . James T. Begg (R)
 . Martin L. Davey (D)
 . C. Ellis Moore (R)
 . John McSweeney (D)
 . William M. Morgan (R)
 . B. Frank Murphy (R)
 . John G. Cooper (R)
 . Charles A. Mooney (D)
 . Robert Crosser (D)
 . Theodore E. Burton (R)

Oklahoma 
 . Everette B. Howard (D)
 . William W. Hastings (D)
 . Charles D. Carter (D)
 . Thomas D. McKeown (D)
 . Fletcher B. Swank (D)
 . J. W. Elmer Thomas (D)
 . James V. McClintic (D)
 . Milton C. Garber (R)

Oregon 
 . Willis C. Hawley (R)
 . Nicholas J. Sinnott (R)
 . Elton Watkins (D)

Pennsylvania 
 . William S. Vare (R)
 . George S. Graham (R)
 . Harry C. Ransley (R)
 . George W. Edmonds (R)
 . James J. Connolly (R)
 . George A. Welsh (R)
 . George P. Darrow (R)
 . Thomas S. Butler (R)
 . Henry W. Watson (R)
 . William W. Griest (R)
 . Laurence H. Watres (R)
 . John J. Casey (D)
 . George F. Brumm (R)
 . William M. Croll (D)
 . Louis T. McFadden (R)
 . Edgar R. Kiess (R)
 . Herbert W. Cummings (D)
 . Edward M. Beers (R)
 . Frank C. Sites (D)
 . George M. Wertz (R)
 . J. Banks Kurtz (R)
 . Samuel F. Glatfelter (D)
 . William I. Swoope (R)
 . Samuel A. Kendall (R)
 . Henry W. Temple (R)
 . Thomas W. Phillips Jr. (R)
 . Nathan L. Strong (R)
 . Harris J. Bixler (R)
 . Milton W. Shreve (R)
 . Everett Kent (D)
 . Adam M. Wyant (R)
 . Stephen G. Porter (R)
 . M. Clyde Kelly (R)
 . John M. Morin (R)
 . James M. Magee (R)
 . Guy E. Campbell (R)

Rhode Island 
 . Clark Burdick (R)
 . Richard S. Aldrich (R)
 . Jeremiah E. O'Connell (D)

South Carolina 
 . W. Turner Logan (D)
 . James F. Byrnes (D)
 . Frederick H. Dominick (D)
 . John J. McSwain (D)
 . William F. Stevenson (D)
 . Allard H. Gasque (D)
 . Hampton P. Fulmer (D)

South Dakota 
 . Charles A. Christopherson (R)
 . Royal C. Johnson (R)
 . William Williamson (R)

Tennessee 
 . B. Carroll Reece (R)
 . J. Will Taylor (R)
 . Samuel D. McReynolds (D)
 . Cordell Hull (D)
 . Ewin L. Davis (D)
 . Joseph W. Byrns Sr. (D)
 . William C. Salmon (D)
 . Gordon W. Browning (D)
 . Finis J. Garrett (D)
 . Hubert F. Fisher (D)

Texas 
 . Eugene Black (D)
 . John C. Box (D)
 . Morgan G. Sanders (D)
 . Samuel T. Rayburn (D)
 . Hatton W. Sumners (D)
 . Luther Alexander Johnson (D)
 . Clay Stone Briggs (D)
 . Daniel E. Garrett (D)
 . Joseph J. Mansfield (D)
 . James P. Buchanan (D)
 . Thomas T. Connally (D)
 . Fritz G. Lanham (D)
 . Guinn Williams (D)
 . Harry M. Wurzbach (R)
 . John N. Garner (D)
 . Claude B. Hudspeth (D)
 . Thomas L. Blanton (D)
 . J. Marvin Jones (D)

Utah 
 . Don B. Colton (R)
 . Elmer O. Leatherwood (R)

Vermont 
 . Frederick G. Fleetwood (R)
 . Porter H. Dale (R), until August 11, 1923
 Ernest Willard Gibson (R), from November 6, 1923

Virginia 
 . Schuyler Otis Bland (D)
 . Joseph T. Deal (D)
 . Andrew J. Montague (D)
 . Patrick Henry Drewry (D)
 . James M. Hooker (D)
 . Clifton A. Woodrum (D)
 . Thomas W. Harrison (D)
 . R. Walton Moore (D)
 . George C. Peery (D)
 . Henry St. George Tucker III (D)

Washington 
 . John F. Miller (R)
 . Lindley H. Hadley (R)
 . Albert Johnson (R)
 . John W. Summers (R)
 . J. Stanley Webster (R), until May 8, 1923
 Samuel B. Hill (D), from September 25, 1923

West Virginia 
 . Benjamin L. Rosenbloom (R)
 . Robert E. L. Allen (D)
 . Stuart F. Reed (R)
 . George W. Johnson (D)
 . Thomas J. Lilly (D)
 . J. Alfred Taylor (D)

Wisconsin 
 . Henry A. Cooper (R)
 . Edward Voigt (R)
 . John M. Nelson (R)
 . John C. Schafer (R)
 . Victor L. Berger (Soc.)
 . Florian Lampert (R)
 . Joseph D. Beck (R)
 . Edward E. Browne (R)
 . George J. Schneider (R)
 . James A. Frear (R)
 . Hubert H. Peavey (R)

Wyoming 
 . Charles E. Winter (R)

Non-voting members
 . Daniel A. Sutherland (R)
 . William P. Jarrett (D)
 . Isauro Gabaldon (Nac.)
 . Pedro Guevara (Nac.)
 . Félix Córdova Dávila

Changes in membership
The count below reflects changes from the beginning of the first session of this Congress.

Senate 
 Replacements: 8
 Democratic: no net change
 Republican: 1 seat net loss
 Farmer–Labor: 1 seat net gain
 Deaths: 7
 Resignations: 0
 Vacancy: 0
Total seats with changes: 7

House of Representatives
 Replacements: 22
 Democratic: 1 seat net gain
 Republican: 1 seat net loss
 Deaths: 15
 Resignations: 6
 Contested election: 0
Total seats with changes: 24

Committees

Senate

 Agriculture and Forestry  (Chairman: George W. Norris; Ranking Member: Ellison D. Smith)
 Alien Property Custodian's Office (Select)
 Appropriations (Chairman: Francis E. Warren; Ranking Member: Lee S. Overman)
 Audit and Control the Contingent Expenses of the Senate (Chairman: Henry W. Keyes; Ranking Member: Kenneth McKellar)
 Banking and Currency (Chairman: George P. McLean; Ranking Member: Duncan U. Fletcher)
 Civil Service (Chairman: James Couzens then Porter H. Dale; Ranking Member: Kenneth McKellar)
 Claims (Chairman: Rice W. Means; Ranking Member: Park Trammell)
 Commerce (Chairman: Wesley L. Jones; Ranking Member: Duncan U. Fletcher)
 District of Columbia (Chairman: Arthur Capper; Ranking Member: William H. King)
 Education and Labor (Chairman: Lawrence C. Phipps; Ranking Member: Andrieus A. Jones)
 Enrolled Bills (Chairman: Frank L. Greene; Ranking Member: Coleman L. Blease)
 Expenditures in Executive Departments (Chairman: David A. Reed; Ranking Member: Oscar W. Underwood)
 Finance (Chairman: Reed Smoot; Ranking Member: Furnifold M. Simmons)
 Foreign Relations (Chairman: William E. Borah; Ranking Member: Claude Swanson)
 Immigration (Chairman: Hiram W. Johnson; Ranking Member: William H. King)
 Indian Affairs (Chairman: John W. Harreld; Ranking Member: Henry F. Ashurst)
 Internal Revenue Bureau (Select)
 Interoceanic Canals (Chairman: Walter Evans Edge; Ranking Member: Thomas J. Walsh)
 Interstate Commerce (Chairman: James Eli Watson; Ranking Member: Ellison D. Smith)
 Irrigation and Reclamation (Chairman: Charles L. McNary; Ranking Member: Morris Sheppard)
 Judiciary (Chairman: Albert B. Cummins; Ranking Member: Lee S. Overman)
 Library (Chairman: Simeon D. Fess; Ranking Member: Kenneth McKellar)
 Manufactures (Chairman: William B. McKinley; Ranking Member: Ellison D. Smith)
 Military Affairs (Chairman: James W. Wadsworth Jr.; Ranking Member: Duncan U. Fletcher)
 Mines and Mining (Chairman: Tasker L. Oddie; Ranking Member: Thomas J. Walsh)
 Naval Affairs (Chairman: Frederick Hale; Ranking Member: Claude A. Swanson)
 Patents (Chairman: William M. Butler; Ranking Member: Ellison D. Smith)
 Pensions (Chairman: Peter Norbeck; Ranking Member: Peter G. Gerry)
 Post Office and Post Roads (Chairman: George H. Moses; Ranking Member: Kenneth McKellar)
 Printing (Chairman: George W. Pepper; Ranking Member: Duncan U. Fletcher)
 Privileges and Elections (Chairman: Richard P. Ernst; Ranking Member: William H. King)
 Public Buildings and Grounds (Chairman: Bert M. Fernald; Ranking Member: James A. Reed)
 Public Lands and Surveys (Chairman: Robert Nelson Stanfield; Ranking Member: Key Pittman)
 Rules (Chairman: Charles Curtis; Ranking Member: Lee S. Overman)
 Senatorial Elections (Select)
 Tariff Commission (Select)
 Territories and Insular Possessions (Chairman: Frank B. Willis; Ranking Member: Key Pittman)
 War Finance Corporation Loans (Select)
 Whole

House of Representatives

 Accounts (Chairman: Clarence MacGregor; Ranking Member: Ralph Waldo Emerson Gilbert)
 Agriculture (Chairman: Gilbert N. Haugen; Ranking Member: James B. Aswell)
 Alcoholic Liquor Traffic (Chairman: Grant M. Hudson; Ranking Member: William D. Upshaw)
 Appropriations  (Chairman: Martin B. Madden; Ranking Member: Joseph W. Byrns)
 Banking and Currency (Chairman: Louis T. McFadden; Ranking Member: Otis Wingo)
 Census (Chairman: E. Hart Fenn; Ranking Member: John E. Rankin)
 Civil Service (Chairman: Frederick R. Lehlbach; Ranking Member: Lamar Jeffers)
 Claims (Chairman: Charles L. Underhill; Ranking Member: John C. Box)
 Coinage, Weights and Measures (Chairman: Randolph Perkins; Ranking Member: Bill G. Lowrey)
 Disposition of Executive Papers (Chairman: Edward H. Wason; Ranking Member: Arthur B. Rouse)
 District of Columbia (Chairman: Frederick N. Zihlman; Ranking Member: Christopher D. Sullivan)
 Education (Chairman: Daniel A. Reed; Ranking Member: Bill G. Lowrey)
 Election of the President, Vice President and Representatives in Congress (Chairman: Hays B. White; Ranking Member: Lamar Jeffers)
 Elections No.#1 (Chairman: Don B. Colton; Ranking Member: C.B. Hudspeth)
 Elections No.#2 (Chairman: Bird J. Vincent; Ranking Member: Gordon Browning)
 Elections No.#3 (Chairman: Charles L. Gifford; Ranking Member: Guinn Williams)
 Enrolled Bills (Chairman: Guy E. Campbell; Ranking Member: Thomas L. Blanton)
 Expenditures in the Agriculture Department (Chairman: Edward J. King; Ranking Member: Frank Gardner)
 Expenditures in the Commerce Department (Chairman: Henry R. Rathbone; Ranking Member: Miles C. Allgood)
 Expenditures in the Interior Department (Chairman: William Williamson; Ranking Member: Sol Bloom)
 Expenditures in the Justice Department (Chairman: Willis G. Sears; Ranking Member: Frank Oliver)
 Expenditures in the Labor Department (Chairman: Carroll L. Beedy; Ranking Member: Thomas L. Blanton)
 Expenditures in the Navy Department (Chairman: George F. Brumm; Ranking Member: Charles L. Abernethy)
 Expenditures in the Post Office Department (Chairman: Philip D. Swing; Ranking Member: Guinn Williams)
 Expenditures in the State Department (Chairman: J. Will Taylor; Ranking Member: George C. Peery)
 Expenditures in the Treasury Department (Chairman: Ernest W. Gibson; Ranking Member: Heartsill Ragon)
 Expenditures in the War Department (Chairman: Thaddeus C. Sweet; Ranking Member: Arthur H. Greenwood)
 Expenditures on Public Buildings (Chairman: Elmer O. Leatherwood; Ranking Member: Samuel Dickstein)
 Flood Control (Chairman: Frank R. Reid; Ranking Member: Riley J. Wilson)
 Foreign Affairs (Chairman: Stephen G. Porter; Ranking Member: J. Charles Linthicum)
 Immigration and Naturalization (Chairman: Albert Johnson; Ranking Member: Adolph J. Sabath)
 Indian Affairs (Chairman: John W. Harreld; Ranking Member: Carl Hayden)
 Industrial Arts and Expositions (Chairman: George A. Welsh; Ranking Member: Fritz G. Lanham)
 Inquiry into Operation of the United States Air Services (Select) (Chairman: N/A)
 Insular Affairs (Chairman: Scott Leavitt; Ranking Member: Mell G. Underwood)
 Interstate and Foreign Commerce (Chairman: James S. Parker; Ranking Member: Alben W. Barkley)
 Invalid Pensions (Chairman: Charles E. Fuller; Ranking Member: Mell G. Underwood)
 Irrigation and Reclamation (Chairman: Addison T. Smith; Ranking Member: Carl Hayden)
 Judiciary (Chairman: George S. Graham; Ranking Member: Hatton W. Sumners)
 Labor (Chairman: William F. Kopp; Ranking Member: William D. Upshaw)
 Library (Chairman: Robert Luce; Ranking Member: Ralph Waldo Emerson Gilbert)
 Merchant Marine and Fisheries (Chairman: Frank D. Scott; Ranking Member: Ladislas Lazaro)
 Mileage (Chairman: Carroll L. Beedy; Ranking Member: John W. Moore)
 Military Affairs (Chairman: John M. Morin; Ranking Member: Percy E. Quin)
 Mines and Mining (Chairman: John M. Robsion; Ranking Member: Daniel Sutherland)
 Naval Affairs (Chairman: Thomas S. Butler; Ranking Member: Carl Vinson)
 Patents (Chairman: Albert H. Vestal; Ranking Member: Fritz G. Lanham)
 Pensions (Chairman: Harold Knutson; Ranking Member: William D. Upshaw)
 Post Office and Post Roads (Chairman: William W. Griest; Ranking Member: Thomas M. Bell)
 Printing (Chairman: Edward M. Beers; Ranking Member: William F. Stevenson)
 Public Buildings and Grounds (Chairman: Richard N. Elliott; Ranking Member: Fritz G. Lanham)
 Public Lands (Chairman: Nicholas J. Sinnott; Ranking Member: John E. Raker then John M. Evans)
 Railways and Canals (Chairman: Oscar E. Keller; Ranking Member: William C. Lankford)
 Revision of Laws (Chairman: Roy G. Fitzgerald; Ranking Member: Alfred L. Bulwinkle)
 Rivers and Harbors (Chairman: S. Wallace Dempsey; Ranking Member: Joseph J. Mansfield)
 Roads (Chairman: Cassius C. Dowell; Ranking Member: Edward B. Almon)
 Rules (Chairman: Bertrand H. Snell; Ranking Member: Edward W. Pou) 
 Standards of Official Conduct
 Territories (Chairman: Charles F. Curry; Ranking Member: William C. Lankford)
 War Claims (Chairman: James G. Strong; Ranking Member: Bill G. Lowrey)
 Ways and Means (Chairman: William R. Green; Ranking Member: John N. Garner)
 Woman Suffrage (Chairman: Wallace H. White Jr.; Ranking Member: John E. Raker then Christopher D. Sullivan)
 World War Veterans' Legislation (Chairman: Royal C. Johnson; Ranking Member: Carl Hayden)
 Whole

Joint committees

 Civil Service Retirement Act
 Conditions of Indian Tribes (Special)
 Disposition of (Useless) Executive Papers
 Determine what Employment may be Furnished Federal Prisoners (Chairman: Rep. George S. Graham)
 Investigation of Northern Pacific Railroad Land Grants (Chairman: Rep. Nicholas J. Sinnott)
 Muscle Shoals
 The Library (Chairman: Sen. Simeon D. Fess)
 Printing (Chairman: Sen. George H. Moses; Vice Chairman: Rep. Edgar R. Kiess)
 Taxation (Chairman: Rep. William R. Green)

Caucuses
 Democratic (House)
 Democratic (Senate)

Employees

Legislative branch agency directors
Architect of the Capitol: Elliott Woods, until May 22, 1923
David Lynn, from August 22, 1923
Comptroller General of the United States: John R. McCarl
Librarian of Congress: Herbert Putnam 
Public Printer of the United States: George H. Carter

Senate 
Chaplain: John J. Muir Baptist
Secretary: George A. Sanderson
Librarian: Edward C. Goodwin
Sergeant at Arms: David S. Barry

House of Representatives 
Chaplain: James S. Montgomery Methodist
Clerk: William T. Page
Doorkeeper: Bert W. Kennedy
Clerk at the Speaker's Table: Lehr Fess
Reading Clerks: Patrick Joseph Haltigan (D) and Alney E. Chaffee (R)
Postmaster: Frank W. Collier
Sergeant at Arms: Joseph G. Rodgers

See also 
 1922 United States elections (elections leading to this Congress)
 1922 United States Senate elections
 1923 United States Senate elections
 1922 United States House of Representatives elections
 1924 United States elections (elections during this Congress, leading to the next Congress)
 1924 United States presidential election
 1924 United States Senate elections
 1924 United States House of Representatives elections

Notes

References

External links
Biographical Directory of the U.S. Congress
U.S. House of Representatives: House History
U.S. Senate: Statistics and Lists